The General Confederation of Labor - Workers' Force (or simply , FO), is one of the five major union confederations in France. In terms of following, it is the third behind the CGT and the CFDT.

Force Ouvrière was founded in 1948 by former members of the General Confederation of Labor (CGT) who denounced the dominance of the French Communist Party over that federation. 

FO is a member of the European Trade Union Confederation. Its leader is Pascal Pavageau since April 2018.

History 

After World War II, members of the French Communist Party attained considerable influence within the CGT, controlling 21 of its 30 federations. Senior figures such as Robert Bothereau and the former secretary general, Léon Jouhaux, opposed this development. These opponents denounced Communist influence as a threat to the independent position of trade unions, a principle enshrined in the 1906 Charte d'Amiens. They founded a paper, Force ouvrière.

In 1947, a general strike, fought against the backdrop of the developing Cold War, divided the CGT. The Communist ministers were excluded from the government led by  Paul Ramadier, a Socialist. In this context, the internal CGT opposition created a new trade-union confederation, called FO. The majority of its founders were from the socialist ranks.

In February 1958 the African branches of FO became an independent organization, Confédération Africaine des Syndicats Libres-FO.

In the 1960s, when André Bergeron became leader of the Confederation, the links between FO and the French Section of the Workers' International (SFIO) became distended. Indeed, if Bergeron was an SFIO member, he was also the "main partner" of the employers and the right-wing governments. In this, FO presided the social security offices. Besides, it welcomed Conservatives and Far-Left, notably members of the Internationalist Communist Organization. The hostility to the CGT and to the French Communist Party is the cement of the confederation.

In the 1970s, FO leaders were sceptical about the Socialist strategy of alliance with the Communist Party. Then, they criticized the nomination of Communist ministers in 1981. After François Mitterrand's election, FO presented like the only independent trade-union confederation.

In 1989, Marc Blondel was elected leader of FO, against the will of Bergeron. He wanted to preserve the independence of the confederation. Supported by the radical minority, he adopted a more combative attitude. In this, he participated in the 1995 social conflict against Alain Juppé's plans for welfare reform, and improved relations with the CGT. In consequence, FO lost the precedence of social security offices for the benefit of the Confédération Française Démocratique du Travail.

In 2003, Blondel called for a general strike against the plan of pensions reforms. Then, he let his function to Jean-Claude Mailly. FO participated in the 2006 campaign against the Contrat première embauche. In April 2018, Pascal Pavageau, which presents himself as being part of the historical and traditional Workers' Force trend (independence of trade unions towards the political parties) became the new secretary general.

General Secretaries
Robert Bothereau (1948-1963)
André Bergeron (1963-1989)
Marc Blondel (1989-2004)
Jean-Claude Mailly (2004-2018)
Pascal Pavageau (2018-2018)
Yves Veyrier (2018 to date)

CIA involvement
The group's ties with the American Central Intelligence Agency (CIA) were leaked in 1967 by Thomas Braden, a former director of covert operations for the agency. In his expose on The Saturday Evening Post, Braden wrote of the CGT strike: "Into this crisis stepped [Jay] Lovestone and his assistant, Irving Brown. With funds from Dubinsky's union, they organized Force Ouvrière, a non-Communist union. When they ran out of money, they appealed to the CIA. Thus began the secret subsidy of free trade unions which soon spread to Italy. Without that subsidy, postwar history might have gone very differently." American influence was never total, and there were disputes between FO leadership and the American representatives (for example, over French colonialism).

The Reagan administration continued support to the organization through the National Endowment for Democracy.

Professional elections
FO won 15.81% of the vote in the employees' college during the 2008 professional elections. This is below FO's 18.28% result in 2002. Its highest ever result was 20.55% in 1997.

Affiliates
The following federations are affiliated:

The General Federation of Public Servants brings together those federations representing civil servants.

See also

 Politics of France
 Trade unions:
 French Democratic Confederation of Labour
 French Confederation of Christian Workers
 General Confederation of Labour
 French Confederation of Management - General Confederation of Executives
 Solidaires Unitaires Démocratiques
 Mouvement des Entreprises de France

References

International Trade Union Confederation
European Trade Union Confederation
National trade union centers of France
Trade unions established in 1948